Carmelo Pirrera, pen name 'Omar Pirrera  (10 December 1932 – 23 January 2021) was an Italian poet, writer, and essayist.

He contracted COVID-19 during the COVID-19 pandemic in Italy while living in a retirement home. He died of the virus in Vallo della Lucania in January 2021, at the age of 88.

Works

Poems
 Deserto e poesia
 Cosmo e poesia
 Mistero e poesia
  Morire con il Sole
 Credi per non morire prima di morire

Novels 
 Colloqui con Parmenide
 La leggenda di Calafato parte I, II e III

Essays and other writings 
 Futurismo e dintorni
 Sul Dialogus de oratoribus di Tacito
 Storia della ricerca scientifica
 Antologia dei Poeti preferiti
 La consapevolezza dell'Essere
 Pietro Giordani uno dei tanti incompresi
 Gelone: un grande siciliano
 Cartesio e la nascita della geometria analitica
 In Federico II l'Ulisse dantesco
 Come dal finito nasce l'infinito
 Giuliano l'Apostata: un ingenuo sognatore
 Origini del conflitto tra Papato e Impero
 Krishna e le origini del Cristianesimo
 Come nasce il “volgare”
 Paganesimo e Cristianesimo
 Socrate: l'interfaccia di Platone
 Socrate decise di morire
 Leopardi e la gloria
 Antonio Ranieri: un altro dimenticato
 Empedocle d'Agrigento: un incompreso
 Giulio Cesare deve morire
 Re Manfredi contro l'arroganza papale
 La morte del pudore
 Sul ritratto di Dorian Gray
 La bellezza
 La donna
 I combattenti
 Esterofili
 La medicina in Magna Graecia ed a Velia
 Il pitagorismo
 I geroglici
 Leopardi e i libri
 Catastrofi finali
 Il Tiranno

References

1932 births
2021 deaths
Italian poets
Deaths from the COVID-19 pandemic in Campania